Muḥammad ʿUthmān Jalāl (1829–1898) was an Egyptian dramatist, translator and author.

Jalal (known as Galal) was the son of a minor official of Turkish ancestry who had married an Egyptian woman.

He was one of the most prolific adapters of French plays and literary texts by La Fontaine, Bernardin de Saint-Pierre, Molière, and Racine, as well as plays by Carlo Goldoni. He rendered several plays by Molière, Racine and Goldoni in the colloquial Egyptian Arabic, including a version of Molière's Tartuffe, .

Bibliography

References 

1829 births
1898 deaths
20th-century Egyptian writers
Egyptian dramatists and playwrights